Gerrit van Duffelen (21 September 1889 – 5 April 1967) was a Dutch painter. His work was part of the painting event in the art competition at the 1928 Summer Olympics. His work was included in the 1939 exhibition and sale Onze Kunst van Heden (Our Art of Today) at the Rijksmuseum in Amsterdam.

References

1889 births
1967 deaths
20th-century Dutch painters
Dutch male painters
Olympic competitors in art competitions
Painters from Rotterdam
20th-century Dutch male artists